The Snickleway Inn is a grade II* listed pub, in the city centre of York, in England.

The pub lies on Goodramgate, next to the Wealden Hall.  The oldest part is the front section of the building, constructed about 1500, at the same time as the neighbouring hall.  It is three stories high and four bays wide.  In the 17th-century, a wing was added, and in the mid-19th century, this was altered, while the building was refronted.  To the rear, there is an outbuilding, which was constructed in about 1600, and has been extensively rebuilt in several phases.  The whole building is timber-framed throughout, with some brick infill, while the front is plastered over.

The building has been used as a pub from at least the 18th-century.  It was originally named the "Painters' Arms", then successively became the "Square and Compasses", the "Mason's Arms" (c. 1823), "The Board" (c. 1841) and the "Joiner's Arms" (c. 1851).  By 1872, it was renamed as the "Anglers' Arms".  In 1994, while Frank Cartin was the landlord, it was renamed as "The Snickleway Inn", referencing the snickelways of York, but deliberately misspelling the word, to avoid copyright issues.

The York Press named the pub as one of the five most haunted in the city, claiming that it is home to five spirits, including Mrs Tulliver and her cat, Seamus.  Another ghost is said to be Marmaduke Buckle, a disabled man who lived in the early 18th-century, who committed suicide while living in the property.

References

Goodramgate
Grade II* listed pubs in York
Grade II* listed houses
Houses completed in 1500
Houses in North Yorkshire
Timber framed buildings in Yorkshire
Timber framed pubs in England